Talk Memory is the fifth solo album by Canadian instrumental group BadBadNotGood. It was released on October 8, 2021, by XL Recordings and Innovative Leisure, and is the band's first album in five years. A mostly improvisational work, it was produced and written by the trio with contributions from featured American instrumentalists Laraaji, Karriem Riggins, Terrace Martin, and Brandee Younger, and string arrangements from Brazilian composer Arthur Verocai. 

Following promotion on social media in early July, the band officially announced the album on July 15, 2021, simultaneously releasing the lead single "Signal from the Noise".

Background 
The album functions as a barometer for the band's growth in the five interim years since their last album; besides the 2020 single "Goodbye Blue", this is the first original release recorded after the sessions for IV. In a press release, the band said: "It took a year or two of just living life to get to the place where the creative process was exciting again and once we actually went in to the studio it was the most concise recording and writing process we’ve ever had. We hope that the improvised studio performances bring the listener closer to our live experience."

This is the first album from the band without founding keyboardist Matthew Tavares; he departed in 2019. The long period of time between Talk Memory and IV was partly due to Taveres' leaving the group. As Leland Whitty told PostGenre, "[a]fter [Matt] quit the band in 2019, it took us time to establish a new vision of what the band would be like without him."

Release and reception 

The trio released their first album single on July 15, 2021, "Signal from the Noise"; a "nine-minute psychedelic jazz fusion odyssey", the track was produced with Floating Points and accompanied by a music video directed by Duncan Loudon. The second single, "Beside April", was released on September 8, 2021.

The album was released on October 8, 2021. It is the band's first album with XL Recordings, who released it in partnership with Innovative Leisure (to which the band has been signed since 2013). Multiple limited edition color variants of the LP are available from different retailers, including their web store and VMP (Vinyl Me, Please).

Overall, the album received generally favorable review from critics, with opinions of the album ranging from "virtuosic" to that of "considered jam sessions." In a very positive review, Dean Van Nguyen of Pitchfork commented: “BadBadNotGood are known for turning tradition inside out, but Talk Memory is not just their finest album—it’s evidence of the historic appreciation that roots their reverence;” comparing the album to the group’s previous work, he detailed that “the velvety play and mildly psychedelic grooves are still present, but Talk Memory is also BBNG’s most compositionally complex record to date: It draws you in with vibrant hooks and melodic flourishes, then begs you to return and fully absorb its subtleties.”

The album was longlisted for the 2022 Polaris Music Prize.

Accolades

Track listing 

Notes
  signifies an additional producer.
  signifies an assistant producer.
 Arthur Verocai is credited for string arrangements on tracks 3–4 and 8–9.

Personnel 
Adapted from album notes.

BadBadNotGood
 Leland Whitty – soprano and tenor saxophone, flute, guitar, bass ("City of Mirrors", "Open Channels"), piano, synthesizer
 Chester Hansen – bass, guitar ("City of Mirrors"), piano, organ, synthesizer
 Al Sow – drums, percussion

Musicians
 Laraaji – electric zither ("Unfolding (Momentum 73)")
 Karriem Riggins – percussion ("Beside April")
 Brandee Younger – harp ("Talk Meaning")
 Terrace Martin – alto saxophone ("Talk Meaning")
 Arthur Verocai – string arrangements
 Clóvis Pereira Filho – violin
 Ubiratã Rodrigues – violin
 Wagner Rodrigues – violin
 André Cunha Rego – violin
 Nikolay Sapoundjiev – violin
 William Issac – violin
 Emila Valova – cello
 Lisiane de los Santos – cello
 David Chew – cello
 Victor Botene – viola
 Samuel Passos – viola
 Nic Jodoin – tape effects

Technical
 Nic Jodoin – engineer
 Travis Pavur – assistant engineer
 William Luna – engineer (Brazil)
 Russell Elevado – mixing
 Alex DeTurk – mastering
 Scott Hull – lacquer cutting
 Matthew Langille – A&R
 Patrick North  – A&R

Artwork
 BadBadNotGood – creative direction
 Alaska-Alaska™ (Virgil Abloh, Tawanda Chiweshe, Francisco Gaspar) – creative direction 
 Elias Hanzer – typeface
 Jamal Burger – cover photography
 Ivan Narez – gatefold photography

Charts

References 

2021 albums
Innovative Leisure albums
XL Recordings albums